Steve Rivkin (January 13, 1947 – November 16, 2016) was an American marketing and communications consultant, author and speaker.   He founded Rivkin & Associates LLC in 1989.

Biography
The son of a pharmacist, Rivkin came from a medical family that included a general practitioner, a thoracic surgeon, an ob-gyn, a radiologist, and an infertility specialist.
He consulted with healthcare organizations and more than 100 community hospitals on marketing and public affairs issues, working with a partner Fraser P. Seitel, author of The Practice of Public Relations.

In 2006, Rivkin was appointed Senior Fellow in Health Communications & Marketing Strategy for the Estes Park Institute, a national healthcare educational organization.  He served on the board of directors of the Estes Park Institute and Volunteers in Medicine. In 2015 he was named CEO of the Estes Park Institute.

Another of his specialized practice areas was in naming. His firm created new names for companies and brands. The 2004 book he co-authored, The Making of a Name, was described by Library Journal as "an authoritative and fascinating book on names and naming that will be used by entrepreneurs, students, inventors, marketers, and wordsmiths at all levels."

Prior to forming his own firm, Rivkin spent 14 years working with Jack Trout and Al Ries at Trout & Ries Inc., a marketing strategy firm known for its work in positioning He left Trout & Ries as executive vice president.

Rivkin was a frequent speaker on marketing and communications topics, at company seminars, industry conferences, and a contributor to business and trade publications.

Bibliography
Rivkin is the co-author of six books on business and marketing strategy.

Differentiate or Die, by Jack Trout and Steve Rivkin, 2nd edition, 2008, John Wiley & Sons.
The Making of a Name, by Steve Rivkin and Fraser Sutherland, Oxford University Press, 2004.
IdeaWise, by Steve Rivkin and Fraser Seitel, John Wiley & Sons, 2002.
The Power of Simplicity, by Jack Trout and Steve Rivkin, McGraw-Hill, 1998.
The New Positioning, by Jack Trout and Steve Rivkin, McGraw-Hill, 1996.
Repositioning: Marketing in an Era of Competition, Change and Crisis, by Jack Trout and Steve Rivkin, McGraw-Hill, 2010.

References

External links
Rivkin & Associates, LLC
Steve Rivkin's Naming Newsletter

1947 births
2016 deaths
Marketing theorists
Marketing speakers